Plectaneia is a genus of plant in the family Apocynaceae first described as a genus in 1806. The entire genus is endemic to Madagascar.

Species
 Plectaneia longisepala Markgr. 
 Plectaneia stenophylla Jum.
 Plectaneia thouarsii Roem. & Schult.

References

Apocynaceae genera
Endemic flora of Madagascar
Rauvolfioideae